Salvia wagneriana is a perennial found in Nicaragua, Costa Rica, Guatemala, El Salvador, and the Mexican state of Chiapas, growing at  elevation in warm, moist areas. It is very popular among gardeners near its native habitat, and one of the few native plants taken from the wild by local gardeners. It is described sometimes as a herb and sometimes as a shrub by various botanists.

The underside of the leaf has raised veins. The flowers range in color from bright red to rose to pinkish cream, with highly colored bracts and calyces that are different colors than the flower.

Notes

Plants described in 1878
wagneriana
Flora of Costa Rica
Flora of El Salvador
Flora of Guatemala
Flora of Mexico
Flora of Nicaragua